The 1940 Bowling Green Falcons football team was an American football team that represented Bowling Green State College (later renamed Bowling Green State University) in the Ohio Athletic Conference (OAC) during the 1940 college football season. In their sixth season under head coach Harry Ockerman, the Falcons compiled a 3–4–1 record, finished in 11th place out of 19 teams in the OAC, and were outscored by a total of 122 to 62. Steve Brudzinski was the team captain. The team played its home games at University Stadium in Bowling Green, Ohio.

Schedule

References

Bowling Green
Bowling Green Falcons football seasons
Bowling Green Falcons football